The Elgon shrew (Crocidura elgonius) is a species of mammal in the family Soricidae. It is found in Kenya and Tanzania. Its natural habitat is subtropical or tropical moist montane forests.

References

Crocidura
Mammals described in 1910
Taxonomy articles created by Polbot